Mohan Nayak (3 July 1921 – 26 September 1983) was an Indian politician. He was elected to the Lok Sabha, the lower house of the Parliament of India as a member of the Indian National Congress.

Was imprisoned in 1940 and 1941 for satyagraha and again in 1942 in the Quit India Movement.

References

1921 births
1983 deaths
Lok Sabha members from Odisha
India MPs 1957–1962
India MPs 1962–1967
Indian National Congress politicians from Odisha
Odisha MLAs 1952–1957
Odisha MLAs 1957–1961